Goniobranchus albomaculatus is a species of sea slug, a dorid nudibranch, a marine gastropod mollusc in the family Chromodorididae''.

Distribution
This species was described from a locality given just as "Pacific Islands".

Description
This chromodorid nudibranch was described as follows: 
Colour orange-yellow, margin bright violet, shading off into the ground colour, tubercles whitish, cervical tentacles, branchiae, and under surface cream white. Length 2 inches.

References

Chromodorididae
Gastropods described in 1866